The 2017 All-Big Ten Conference football team consists of American football players chosen as All-Big Ten Conference players for the 2017 Big Ten Conference football season.  The conference recognizes two official All-Big Ten selectors: (1) the Big Ten conference coaches selected separate offensive and defensive units and named first-, second- and third-team players (the "Coaches" team); and (2) a panel of sports writers and broadcasters covering the Big Ten also selected offensive and defensive units and named first-, second- and third-team players (the "Media" team).

Offensive selections

Quarterbacks
 J. T. Barrett, Ohio State (Coaches-1; Media-1)
 Trace McSorley, Penn State (Coaches-2; Media-2)
 Clayton Thorson, Northwestern (Coaches-3; Media-3)

Running backs
 Saquon Barkley, Penn State (Coaches-1; Media-1)
 Jonathan Taylor, Wisconsin (Coaches-1; Media-1)
 Justin Jackson, Northwestern (Coaches-2; Media-2)
 J. K. Dobbins, Ohio State (Coaches-2; Media-2)
 Akrum Wadley, Iowa (Coaches-3; Media-3)
 Karan Higdon, Michigan (Coaches-3; Media-3)

Wide receivers
 Simmie Cobbs, Indiana (Coaches-1; Media-1)
 D. J. Moore, Maryland (Coaches-1; Media-1)
 Stanley Morgan Jr., Nebraska (Coaches-2; Media-2)
 DaeSean Hamilton, Penn State (Coaches-2; Media-3)
 Felton Davis III, Michigan State (Coaches-3; Media-2)
 Parris Campbell, Ohio State (Coaches-3)
 JD Spielman, Nebraska (Media-3)

Centers
 Billy Price, Ohio State (Coaches-1; Media-1)
 Brian Allen, Michigan State (Coaches-2; Media-2)
 Tyler Biadasz, Wisconsin (Coaches-3; Media-3)

Guards
 Beau Benzschawel, Wisconsin (Coaches-1; Media-1)
 Michael Jordan, Ohio State (Coaches-1; Media-2)
 Sean Welsh, Iowa (Coaches-2; Media-1)
 Ben Bredeson, Michigan (Coaches-2; Media-2)
 David Beedle, Michigan State (Coaches-3; Media-3)
 Tommy Doles, Northwestern (Coaches-3; Media-3)

Tackles
 Jamarco Jones, Ohio State (Coaches-1; Media-1)
 Michael Deiter, Wisconsin (Coaches-1; Media-1)
 Mason Cole, Michigan (Coaches-2; Media-2)
 David Edwards, Wisconsin (Coaches-2; Media-2)
 Isaiah Prince, Ohio State (Coaches-3; Media-3)
 Ryan Bates, Penn State (Coaches-3; Media-3)

Tight ends
 Troy Fumagalli, Wisconsin (Coaches-1; Media-2)
 Mike Gesicki, Penn State (Coaches-2; Media-1)
 Noah Fant, Iowa (Coaches-3; Media-3)

Defensive selections

Defensive linemen
 Nick Bosa, Ohio State (Coaches-1; Media-1)
 Tyquan Lewis, Ohio State (Coaches-1; Media-1)
 Maurice Hurst, Michigan (Coaches-1; Media-1)
 Rashan Gary, Michigan (Coaches-1; Media-2)	
 Chase Winovich, Michigan (Coaches-2; Media-1)
 Sam Hubbard, Ohio State (Coaches-2; Media-2)
 Alec James, Wisconsin (Coaches-2; Media-2)
 Conor Sheehy, Wisconsin (Coaches-2; Media-3)
 Joe Gaziano, Northwestern (Coaches-3; Media-2)
 Kenny Willekes, Michigan State (Coaches-3; Media-3)
 Dre'Mont Jones, Ohio State (Coaches-3)
 Gelen Robinson, Purdue (Coaches-3)
 Anthony Nelson, Iowa (Media-3)
 Shareef Miller, Penn State (Media-3)

Linebackers
 Josey Jewell, Iowa (Coaches-1; Media-1)
 T. J. Edwards, Wisconsin (Coaches-1; Media-1)
 Devin Bush, Michigan (Coaches-1; Media-2)
 Tegray Scales, Indiana (Coaches-2; Media-1)
 Garret Dooley, Wisconsin (Coaches-2; Media-3)
 Jason Cabinda, Penn State (Coaches-2)
 Khaleke Hudson, Michigan (Coaches-3; Media-2)
 Paddy Fisher, Northwestern (Coaches-3; Media-2)
 Joe Bachie, Michigan State (Coaches-3; Media-3)
 Thomas Barber, Minnesota (Media-3)

Defensive backs
 Josh Jackson, Iowa (Coaches-1; Media-1)
 Nick Nelson, Wisconsin (Coaches-1; Media-1)
 Marcus Allen, Penn State (Coaches-1; Media-2)
 D'Cota Dixon, Wisconsin (Coaches-1; Media-3)
 Denzel Ward, Ohio State (Coaches-2; Media-1)
 David Dowell, Michigan State (Media-1)
 Rashard Fant, Indiana (Coaches-3; Media-2)
 Godwin Igwebuike, Northwestern (Coaches-2; Media-2)
 Amani Oruwariye, Penn State (Coaches-2; Media-2)
 Kyle Queiro, Northwestern (Coaches-3; Media-3)
 Lavert Hill, Michigan (Coaches-2)
 Jordan Fuller, Ohio State (Coaches-3)
 Derrick Tindal, Wisconsin (Coaches-3)
 Josiah Scott, Michigan State (Media-3)
 Damon Webb, Ohio State (Media-3)

Special teams

Kickers
 Griffin Oakes, Indiana (Coaches-1; Media-1)
 Rafael Gaglianone, Wisconsin (Coaches-2; Media-2)
 Sean Nuernberger, Ohio State (Coaches-3; Media-3)

Punters
 Ryan Anderson, Rutgers (Coaches-1; Media-1)
 Blake Gillikin, Penn State (Coaches-2; Media-2)
 Drue Chrisman, Ohio State (Coaches-3; Media-3)

Return specialist
 Saquon Barkley, Penn State (Coaches-1; Media-1)
 DeAndre Thompkins, Penn State (Coaches-2; Media-3)
 Parris Campbell, Ohio State (Coaches-3; Media-2)

Key

See also
 2017 College Football All-America Team

References

All-Big Ten Conference
All-Big Ten Conference football teams